The Crew may refer to:

 The nickname for the Columbus Crew, a Major League Soccer franchise 
 The Crew (1994 film), directed by Carl-Jan Colpaert and starring Viggo Mortensen, Donal Logue, and Jeremy Sisto
 The Crew (2000 film), directed by Michael Dinner and starring Burt Reynolds
 The Crew (2008 film), a British crime film
 The Crew (2015 film), a French crime film
 The Crew (1995 TV series),  an American sitcom that aired on Fox
 The Crew (Australian TV series), an Australian TV series
 The Crew (2021 TV series), an American comedy television series on Netflix
 The Crew (web series), a science fiction comedy web series
 The Crew (album), a 1984 album by 7 Seconds
 The Crew (band), a 1990 music group
 The Crew (comics), a Marvel Comic
 The Crew, a novel by Bali Rai
 The Crew (2014 video game), a 2014 racing video game
 The Crew 2 (2018 video game), the 2018 sequel
 The Crew (card game), a cooperative trick-taking game released in 2019
 The Crew League, 5-on-5 hiphop entertainment street rules basketball league.

See also 
 Crew (disambiguation)